TM Forum is a global industry association for service providers and their suppliers in the telecommunications industry. Members include communications and digital service providers, telephone companies, cable operators, network operators, cloud providers, digital infrastructure providers, software suppliers, equipment suppliers, systems integrators and management consultancies. The Forum has over 850 member companies, including ten of the top ten world's largest telecommunications service providers, that collectively generate US$2 trillion in revenue and serve five billion customers across 180 countries.

Activities
TM Forum provides an open, collaborative environment along with practical tools and information to help its members in their digital transformation initiatives. Its services include:

 Labs - member projects where you can invent, build and test new solutions
 Knowledge - practical and honest guidance from a global community of over 100,000 users
 Code + frameworks - Real code and practical guides, crowdsourced by members, for members, and ready for you to use
 Training + accreditation - a portfolio of training, certification and services to upskill your people and validate your products
 Events - a series of in person and virtual events where you can learn, network and collaborate. 

TM Forum's work includes Open Digital Framework, Open Digital Architecture, a suite of over 60 REST-based Open APIs.

History 
TM Forum was founded as the OSI/Network Management Forum in 1988 by eight companies to collaboratively solve systems and operational management issues with the OSI protocols.
In 1998 the name was changed to the TeleManagement Forum. In 2008, the organization changed its name to TM Forum.

Conferences & Events
TM Forum hosts a variety of digital and in-person events year-round.

In September 2022, TM Forum held its first in-person event post Covid-19 pandemic when Digital Transformation World (DTW) 2022 opened doors at the Bella Center, Copenhagen.
 DTW 2023 returns to Copenhagen 19–21 September 2023/ 
 DTW Asia 2023 will take place in Bangkok, 14–16 March 2023
 Accelerate is a collaborative event where members come together to work with like-minded peers and industry experts on projects covering AI, data analytics, customer experience management, digital ecosystems, Open APIs, and more. TM Forum hosts both in person and virtual Accelate events throughout the year.
 TM Forum Local events are networking events held in locations around the world.
 Digital Leadership Summits are invitation-only workshops held in locations around the world.

References

External links
 

Technology trade associations
Telecommunications organizations
Organizations established in 1988